Prostitution (French: La prostitution) is a 1963 French drama film directed by Maurice Boutel and starring Etchika Choureau, Evelyne Dassas and Alain Lionel.

Cast
 Etchika Choureau as Olga  
 Evelyne Dassas as Irene  
 Alain Lionel as Mario  
 Alicia Gutiérrez as Concepçión  
 Anne Darden as Martha  
 Rita Cadillac as Rita  
 Gabrielle Robinne as Honorine  
 Victor Guyau as Pauwels  
 Robert Dalban as Robert  
 Carl Eich as Franck  
 Raúl Dantés as Joaquin  
 Hinsing Chow as Bangchow  
 Jacques Devos as Bit Part

References

Bibliography 
 Philippe Rège. Encyclopedia of French Film Directors, Volume 1. Scarecrow Press, 2009.

External links 
 

1963 films
1963 drama films
French drama films
1960s French-language films
Films directed by Maurice Boutel
1960s French films